A battery electric bus is an electric bus that is driven by an electric motor and obtains energy from on-board batteries. Many trolleybuses use batteries as an auxiliary or emergency power source.

In 2018, the National Renewable Energy Laboratory (NREL) found that total operating costs per mile of an electric bus fleet and a diesel bus fleet in the United States are about equal.

History

The London Electrobus Company started running the first ever service of battery-electric buses between London's Victoria station and Liverpool Street on 15 July 1907. However, the weight and inefficiency of batteries meant that other propulsion technology - such as electric trolleybuses or diesel buses - became commonplace.

The first battery buses were mostly small, mini- or midi- buses. 
The improvement of battery technology from around 2010 led to the emergence of the mass-produced battery bus, including heavier units such as  standard buses and articulated buses. 
China was the first country to introduce modern battery electric buses in large scale. In 2009 Shanghai catenary bus lines began switching to battery buses.
In September 2010, Chinese automobile company BYD began manufacturing the BYD K9, one of the most popular electric buses

The first city to heavily invest in electric buses was Shenzhen, China. The city began rolling out electric buses made by BYD in 2011, with the objective of having a fully electric fleet. By 2017, Shenzhen's entire fleet of over 16,300 buses was replaced with electric buses, the largest fleet of electric buses of any city in the world.

According to Bloomberg, "China had about 99 percent of the 385,000 electric buses on the roads worldwide in 2017, accounting for 17 percent of the country’s entire fleet." Chinese cities are adding 1,900 electric buses per week.

Charging 

Charging electric bus batteries is not as simple as refueling a diesel engine. Special attention, monitoring, and scheduling are required to make optimal use of the charging process, while also ensuring proper battery maintenance and safekeeping. Some operators manage these challenges by purchasing extra buses. This way the charging can take place only at night, which has the further advantage of mitigating the strain on the power grid since charging is then taking place while power consumption elsewhere is minimal. While this is a safe solution, it is also very costly and not scalable. Another solution is ensuring that the vehicle daily schedule takes into account also the need to charge, keeping the overall schedule as close to optimal as possible. Today, there are various software companies that help bus operators manage their electric bus charging schedule. These solutions ensure that buses continue to operate safely, without any unplanned stops and inconvenience to passengers.

Supercapacitors can be charged rapidly, reducing the time needed to prepare to resume operation.

The Society of Automotive Engineers has published Recommended Practice SAE J3105 to standardize physical automated connection interfaces for conductive charging systems since 2020. For communication between charger and electric bus the same ISO 15118 protocol is used as for passenger car charging. The only differences are in the charging power, voltage and physical interface.

Pantographs and underbody collectors can be integrated in bus stops to quicken electric bus recharge, making it possible to use a smaller battery on the bus, which reduces the initial investment and subsequent costs.

Advantages and disadvantages

Advantages
Battery electric buses offer the potential for zero-emissions, in addition to much quieter operation and better acceleration compared to traditional buses. They also eliminate infrastructure needed for a constant grid connection and allow routes to be modified without infrastructure changes, in contrast with a trolleybus. They typically recover braking energy to increase efficiency by a regenerative brake.

Disadvantages
As of 2016 battery buses have less range, higher weight, higher procurement costs. The reduced infrastructure for overhead lines is offset by the costs of the infrastructure to recharge the batteries. In addition, the additional weight of batteries in a battery-electric bus means that they have a lower passenger capacity than trolleybuses in jurisdictions where there is a legal limit on axle loads on roads. Battery buses are used almost exclusively in urban areas rather than for long-haul transportation. Urban transit features relatively short intervals between charging opportunities. Sufficient recharging can take place within 4 to 5 minutes usually by induction or catenary. Finally, as with other electric-powered alternatives to fossil-fueled engines, battery electric buses are not a truly zero-emission solution if the power grid they rely on for charging is not also free of fossil fuel energy sources. The lithium batteries may also contribute to environmental pollution around the world where lithium mining takes place.

Total operating cost per mile
NREL publishes zero-emission bus evaluation results from various commercial operators. NREL published following total operating cost per mile: with County Connection, for June 2017 through May 2018, for an 8-vehicle diesel bus fleet, the total operating cost per mile was $0.84; for a 4-vehicle electric bus fleet, $1.11; with Long Beach Transit, for 2018, for a 10-vehicle electric bus fleet, $0.85; and with Foothill Transit, for 2018, for a 12-vehicle electric bus fleet, $0.84.

Examples

Asia
 The largest battery bus fleet is in Shenzhen, China - with over 16,000 buses.
 In 2015 BYD planned to launch the first battery-double-decker bus.
 In Gumi, South Korea in 2013 a road section was modified to allow inductive charging while driving. The technology was to be tested with two electric buses.
 In 2015, BYD aimed to sell 6,000 of its buses worldwide. BYD is the world leader in the sale of electric vehicles.
In Iran in 2021 the first electrical bus manufactured by Parsan Electrical Bus Manufacturing Company with the brand name of SHETAB.

Europe

 In 2011, bus manufacturer Contrac Cobus Industries from Wiesbaden announced the Cobus 2500e.
 In autumn 2012, Czech manufacturer Inmod supplied a  vehicle has 22 seats, 35 standing places and a range of  a day, up to  can be extended. The bus is recharged with a quick charger twice a day for one hour.
 Beginning in 2012, the Wiener Linien on bus routes 2A and 3A use electric buses. They are charged to the end user via a pantograph, which is applied to short catenary pieces. These are fed by the tram catenary.
 In May 2013, a battery bus began running between the airport and Palexpo in Geneva, Switzerland. This bus can be partially charged within 15 seconds. At the end of the line the charging process takes three to four minutes. The project cost five million francs.
 In December 2013, BYD Auto electric buses entered service in London on two routes.
 The Regional Transport Ruhr-Lippe GmbH (RLG) (Germany) began operating an electric minibus as a Quartierbus in May 2013. Recharging takes about three hours when fully discharged. Recharging consumes over 1.5 hours during the lunch break.
 In 2013 battery buses entered service in the Netherlands.
 In Germany in 2013 battery buses were undergoing tests in Bremen and in Bonn. 
 In Braunschweig battery buses entered regular service at the end of 2013. The "Emil" (Electromobility means of inductive load) project uses inductive charging. Both vehicles and charging stations were developed with Bombardier.
 Dresdner Verkehrsbetriebe together with the Fraunhofer Institute for Transportation and Infrastructure Systems began testing battery buses on November 3, 2014. On June 17, 2015 passenger service began on the first route in Saxony. A four-minute stop at the last stop provides sufficient charge, with a high-power charger to preheat the passenger compartment.
 The Munich public transport company began testing battery buses in 2008. Experiments with Ebusco vehicles of were expected to reach a range of  using lithium iron phosphate batteries.
 In Pinneberg testing began in 2014.
 In September 2015 four battery buses entered service in Berlin. The Solaris Urbino 12 charge by induction at the last stop.
The bus does not charge during operation and can be operated for half a day. The bus is charged from a rooftop photovoltaic system.
 In Bonn test entered regular service in 2013. The range is at least .
 In 2015, the world's first battery electric double decker bus entered service in London.
 Botosani, Romania planned for public transport to operate fully electrically. at a conversion cost of 20 million euros.
As of 2022, there are over 1,000 electric buses operating in Moscow. This is the largest electric bus fleet in Europe ahead of London's fleet of around 780 buses.

North America

 In California, battery school buses since the end of October 2013 because of significantly lower operating costs, are used. In Hamburg Rampini battery buses entered service in 2014 on line 48.
 The California Department of Transportation contracted with Antelope Valley Transit Authority (AVTA) to switch its buses to 85 BYD battery buses with a range of at least . Models include a  low-floor transit bus, a  low-floor articulated and a  commuter bus. Savings were expected to be $46,000 (41,300 euros) per bus per year.
 In 2017, the MTA (New York City, US) started a test fleet of battery-electric buses, with five New Flyer Xcelsior XE40 CHARGE buses (operating out of Quill Depot) and five Proterra Catalyst BE40 buses  Grand Av Depot. A contract was expected to be awarded in 2020, however it has been pushed back to 2021 due to the COVID-19 pandemic.
 In 2019, The MTA ordered their first electric articulated buses, 15 New Flyer Xcelsior XE60 CHARGE buses, operating out of Quill Depot.
In 2018, Columbia Transportation relegated their older fleet of diesel Nova Bus LFS buses to backup duty and bought six New Flyer Xcelsior XE40 CHARGE buses to replace them.
Capital Metro, serving Austin, Texas, started conversion of its bus fleet (about 450 vehicles) in 2019. Currently there are 12 buses on the road, composed from New Flyer and Proterra-made fleet.

See also

 Charging station
 List of electric bus makers and models
 Solar bus
 Trolleybus

References

 
Buses by type
Electric vehicles
Vehicles introduced in 1907